Julio Oscar Quintana is an Argentines activist in the Workers' Party. He was elected as a provincial deputy in Salta Province in the provincial capital.

External links
 result 
 photo and podcast 
 

Living people
Workers' Party (Argentina) politicians
People from Salta
Year of birth missing (living people)
Place of birth missing (living people)